Arthur Black PC(NI) KC (6 February 1888 – 15 April 1968) was an Irish barrister, judge and Ulster Unionist Party politician.

Born in Belfast, he was educated at Mountpottinger Elementary School and Campbell College, Belfast, and Sidney Sussex College, Cambridge. He was called to the English Bar in 1915 and was appointed as King's Counsel in 1929.

He was elected to the Northern Ireland House of Commons at the 1925 general election as a Member of Parliament (MP) for Belfast South. When constituencies were revised for the 1929 general election, he was elected as the MP for the new Belfast Willowfield constituency, and re-elected there in 1933 and 1938.

He held the seat until he was appointed to the judiciary in November 1941 as Recorder of Belfast and as a County Court judge. He served as Attorney General for Northern Ireland from 1939–1941, Recorder from 1941–43, Judge of the Northern Ireland Supreme Court from 1943–49 and as a Lord Justice of Appeal from 1949-64.

References

1888 births
1968 deaths
Alumni of Sidney Sussex College, Cambridge
English barristers
Ulster Unionist Party members of the House of Commons of Northern Ireland
Members of the House of Commons of Northern Ireland 1925–1929
Members of the House of Commons of Northern Ireland 1929–1933
Members of the House of Commons of Northern Ireland 1933–1938
Members of the House of Commons of Northern Ireland 1938–1945
Members of the Privy Council of Northern Ireland
Attorneys General for Northern Ireland
Northern Ireland junior government ministers (Parliament of Northern Ireland)
Lords Justice of Appeal of Northern Ireland
High Court judges of Northern Ireland
Place of death missing
Politicians from Belfast
Recorders of Belfast
Members of the House of Commons of Northern Ireland for Belfast constituencies
People educated at Campbell College
20th-century English lawyers